Mohamad Navazi (born September 5, 1974) is a retired Iranian football player who mostly played for Esteghlal Tehran, He usually played as a right midfielder.

In the Tehran derby played in 2000, he fought with Hamid Estili at the end of the match and was arrested by police. They were imprisoned in Qasr Prison for 3 days. He was suspended for the rest of season.
Navazi played for Saba Battery F.C. in the 2006 AFC Champions League group stage. He moved back to Esteghlal in 2006 and played there for two seasons.

In January 2013, he became head coach of Azadegan League side Shahrdari Arak.

Club career statistics

Honours 

Esteghlal
Azadegan League Winner: 1
 2000–01
Hazfi Cup Winner: 2
2000, 2002

Saba
Hazfi Cup Winner: 1
2005
Iranian Super Cup Winner: 1
2005

References

External Links

1974 births
Living people
Iranian footballers
Persian Gulf Pro League players
Azadegan League players
Esteghlal F.C. players
Nassaji Mazandaran players
Saba players
2000 AFC Asian Cup players
Asian Games gold medalists for Iran
People from Sarab, East Azerbaijan
Bahman players
Zagros Yasuj F.C. players
Shahrdari Arak F.C. players
Asian Games medalists in football
Footballers at the 1998 Asian Games
Medalists at the 1998 Asian Games
Association football midfielders
Iran international footballers
21st-century Iranian people